Snowshoe Lake is a "T"-shaped lake  in the Great Lakes Basin in Temagami, Nipissing District, Ontario, Canada. The primary outflow is an unnamed creek to Wasaksina Lake, which flows via intermediate lakes into Shiningwood Bay on Lake Temagami.

See also
Lakes of Temagami

References

Lakes of Temagami